Ataenius is a genus of aphodiine dung beetles in the family Scarabaeidae. There are at least 290 described species in Ataenius.

See also
 List of Ataenius species

References

Further reading

External links

 
 

Scarabaeidae genera